Harkrishan Lal Kapur (10 December 1923 – 14 February 2020) was a former Air Vice Marshal of Indian Air Force and a member of the Indian National Congress who served as 11th Lieutenant Governor of Delhi from 16 November 1985 to 3 August 1988.

Early life and education
Kapur was born to civil surgeon Rai Bahadur Dr. Ram Chand Kapur on 10 December 1923 at Rohtak. He graduated from Forman Christian College, Lahore in 1942.

Military service
He was commissioned in Royal Indian Air Force on 11 January 1943. He retired as Air Vice Marshal after 37 years of service on 30 June 1979.

Politics
Kapur joined Indian National Congress after retirement from Indian Air Force. He was nominated for Rajya Sabha in 1985. He took oath on 3 January 1985 but resigned on 14 November 1985 to become Lieutenant Governor of Delhi.

Sports administration
Kapur was also active in sports administration along with his service in Air Force. He served as President of Services Sports Control Board from March 1976 to June 1979. He also served as President of Handball Federation of India from 1976 to 1985.

Awards
Kapur was awarded the Padma Shri, the fourth highest civilian award by Government of India in 1983.

Death
Kapur died at the age of 96 years on 14 February 2020 after prolonged illness at Dehradun where he was residing with his daughter at her house on Rajpura Road. His cremation took place in the same evening with full honour at Lakhibagh Ghat.

References

External links
Biodata from Rajya Sabha Website

1923 births
2020 deaths
Recipients of the Padma Shri in civil service
Recipients of the Ati Vishisht Seva Medal
Recipients of the Param Vishisht Seva Medal
Indian sports executives and administrators
People from British India
Indian Air Force officers
Nominated members of the Rajya Sabha
Lieutenant Governors of Delhi
Indian National Congress politicians